Derek Segal (born 7 May 1960) is a South African former professional tennis player.

Born in Johannesburg, Segal originally represented his native South Africa but switched allegiances to Canada in the late 1970s while he was based in the country. He now lives in the United States.

Segal appeared in the main draw of the 1981 US Open and played qualifiers at Wimbledon. He competed in two Davis Cup ties for Canada, against Mexico in 1984 and the Caribbean/West Indies in 1985.

See also
List of Canada Davis Cup team representatives

References

External links
 
 
 

1960 births
Living people
South African male tennis players
Canadian male tennis players
South African emigrants to Canada
Tennis players from Johannesburg